Korat United Football Club (Thai สโมสรโคราช ยูไนเต็ด), is a Thai football club based in Nakhon Ratchasima, Thailand. The club is currently playing in the Thai Football Amateur Tournament.

Season By Season Record

External links
 Facebook-page

Association football clubs established in 2011
Football clubs in Thailand
Nakhon Ratchasima province
2011 establishments in Thailand